Uniting Church in Sweden is a united Protestant denomination in Sweden.

History
It was established on 4 June 2011 by the merger of the United Methodist Church, Baptist Union of Sweden, and Mission Covenant Church of Sweden.

Initially the name of the unified denomination was the Joint Future Church, before the name was changed during a conference in Karlstad on 11 May 2013 to the present Uniting Church in Sweden or Equmeniakyrkan in Swedish.

References

External links

 
United and uniting churches
Reformed denominations in Europe
Members of the World Communion of Reformed Churches
Christian organizations established in 2011
2011 establishments in Sweden
Baptist denominations in Europe
Methodist denominations
Members of the World Council of Churches
Organizations based in Stockholm
Christian denominations in Sweden